Mikael Qvist is a Swedish and (after 1997) Danish curler and curling coach.

At the national level, he is a seven-time Danish mixed champion curler (1998, 2010, 2011, 2012, 2014, 2016, 2017) and two-time Danish mixed doubles champion curler (2016, 2017).

Teams

Men's

Mixed

Mixed doubles

Record as a coach of national teams

Personal life
Mikael Qvist is a member of a family of Danish curlers. His wife is Trine Qvist - curler, coach and Olympian, they two played many times in mixed teams or mixed doubles. Their children are also a curlers: daughter Gabriella Qvist and son Alexander Qvist. The four of them played as a team, winning the Danish Mixed Curling Championship in 2016 and 2017.

References

External links

Living people
Swedish male curlers
Danish male curlers
Danish curling champions
Swedish emigrants to Denmark
Danish curling coaches
Year of birth missing (living people)
Place of birth missing (living people)